Djo Issama Mpeko (born 30 April 1989) is DR Congolese football player. He plays for Kabuscorp S.C.P, and is playing in the Angolan major league Girabola as a defender.

He previously played for AS Vita Club Kinshasa.

He played for Democratic Republic of the Congo in the 2011 African Nations Championship. During the 2013 Africa Cup of Nations qualification he scored one goal, and went forward to Casablanca in 2013.

Honors

National
DR Congo
Africa Cup of Nations bronze:2015

References

External links 

 TP Mazembe Profile

1986 births
Living people
People from Mbandaka
Democratic Republic of the Congo footballers
Democratic Republic of the Congo international footballers
Association football defenders
AS Vita Club players
TP Mazembe players
Daring Club Motema Pembe players
2013 Africa Cup of Nations players
2015 Africa Cup of Nations players
2017 Africa Cup of Nations players
2019 Africa Cup of Nations players
Kabuscorp S.C.P. players
Expatriate footballers in Angola
Democratic Republic of the Congo expatriate sportspeople in Angola
Democratic Republic of the Congo expatriate footballers
21st-century Democratic Republic of the Congo people
Democratic Republic of the Congo A' international footballers
2011 African Nations Championship players
2020 African Nations Championship players
2022 African Nations Championship players